Brigitte Peterhans (born Brigitte Schlaich) was a German American architect, (born 27 August 1928 in Sulz am Neckar, Germany – died 15 January 2021 in Stuttgart). Peterhans received her Diplom-Ingenieur in 1960 from the University of Stuttgart. Encouraged by Myron Goldsmith, she studied at the Illinois Institute of Technology as a Fulbright fellow (1956-1957) where she received her Master of Architecture in 1962.

She married the photographer and former Bauhaus teacher Walter Peterhans in 1957, who at that time was teaching at the Illinois Institute of Technology. She is the sister of the structural engineer Jörg Schlaich.

As a student she was hired in 1958 by Skidmore Owings and Merrill. She remained at SOM on and off for thirty three years, working with Bruce Graham and Myron Goldsmith on domestic and international projects. Her career includes contributions to projects including Arab International Bank World Trade Center and Hotel, Cairo, Egypt, 1976-1978, 1985-1990; Artigas Foundation, Gallifa, Spain 1985-1989; Baxter Travenol Headquarters and Laboratories, Deerfield, Illinois, 1973-1980; Broadgate Exchange House, London, 1987-1990; Max Eyth Footbridge, Stuttgart, Germany, 1989; Perimeter Center, Atlanta, Georgia, 1981-1986; Sears Tower, Chicago, Illinois, 1970-1972, 1980.

In 1973 Peterhans was made an associate at SOM, and an associate partner in 1979. She retired in 1990.

References

External links 
2021, 29 Jan. “Remembering Brigitte Peterhans, Former SOM Associate Partner.” SOM, 7 Sept. 2021, https://www.som.com/news/remembering-brigitte-peterhans-former-som-associate-partner/

“Brigitte Peterhans Obituary (2021) Chicago Sun-Times.” Legacy.com, https://legacy.suntimes.com/us/obituaries/chicagosuntimes/name/brigitte-peterhans-obituary?pid=197516274

1928 births
Living people
People from Sulz am Neckar
People from the Free People's State of Württemberg
German emigrants to the United States
20th-century American architects
American women architects
Illinois Institute of Technology alumni
20th-century American women
21st-century American women